Lowell High School is a public school located in Vergennes Township, Michigan, United States, with a  Lowell postal address.

By 1992 the school district chose the Steve Wittenbach plot as the current high school location, which in turn helped gift a gas franchise to Grattan Township.

Athletics 
Lowell High School is a member of the Michigan High School Athletic Association. It is a Division II school, and all of its teams currently play within the Ottawa-Kent (O.K.) White League. Lowell's nickname is the Red Arrows, named for the 32nd Red Arrow Infantry in World War II.

When Lowell opened, it was the first school in Michigan to have floodlights illuminating their football field for night games.

Lowell's biggest athletic rival is East Grand Rapids High School.

Lowell is known for its various athletic teams, and most known for its football, wrestling, and equestrian teams. Lowell currently has over ten state titles among the three teams. On October 29, 2009, the Red Arrows football team was ranked #1 in the nation in USA Todays Massey Ratings.

 State football titles: 2002 (Division 2), 2004 (Division 3), 2009 (Division 2)
 State wrestling titles:  2002, 2004, 2009, 2014, 2015, 2016, 2017, 2018, 2019, 2020, 2021 (All Wrestling Division 2)
 State boys bowling titles: 2017 (Division 2)

Notable alumni 
 Gabe Dean, sport wrestler; multiple–time NCAA Division I National champion for Cornell University
 Mike Dumas, professional football player; former Indiana safety; played for eight years in the NFL with four different teams
 Keith Nichol, Michigan State University wide receiver
 Bryan Posthumus, state politician
 Lisa Posthumus Lyons, Michigan – Kent County politician

References

External links 
 Official site
 Lowell Area Schools

Public high schools in Michigan
Schools in Kent County, Michigan